Breaking the Spell: Religion as a Natural Phenomenon is a 2006 book by American philosopher and cognitive scientist Daniel Dennett, in which the author argues that religion is in need of scientific analysis so that its nature and future may be better understood. The "spell" that requires "breaking" is not religious belief itself but the belief that it is off-limits to or beyond scientific inquiry.

Synopsis 
The book is divided into three parts. Dennett's working definition of religions is: "social systems whose participants avow belief in a supernatural agent or agents whose approval is to be sought". He notes that this definition is "a place to start, not something carved in stone".

Part I 
Part I discusses the motivation and justification for the entire project: Can science study religion? Should science study religion?

Part II 
After answering in the affirmative, Part II proceeds to use the tools of evolutionary biology and memetics to suggest possible theories regarding the origin of religion and subsequent evolution of modern religions from ancient folk beliefs.

Part III 
Part III analyzes religion and its effects in today's world: Does religion make us moral? Is religion what gives meaning to life? What should we teach the children? Dennett bases much of his analysis on empirical evidence, though he often points out that much more research in this field is needed.

Critical reception 
The book has received differing reviews from various consumer, mass media outlets.

The Guardian

The Guardians Andrew Brown describes it as giving "a very forceful and lucid account of the reasons why we need to study religious behaviour as a human phenomenon".

Scientific American

In Scientific American, George Johnson describes the book's main draw as being "a sharp synthesis of a library of evolutionary, anthropological and psychological research on the origin and spread of religion".

New Yorker

In The New Yorker, evolutionary biologist H. Allen Orr described the book as "an accessible account of what might be called the natural history of religion".

The New York Review of Books

In The New York Review of Books, Freeman Dyson wrote:

From the religious community

The New York Times
Leon Wieseltier, former member of the editorial board of the Jewish Review of Books, called the book, in The New York Times, "a sorry instance of present-day scientism" and alleged it to be "a merry anthology of contemporary superstitions".

The New Atlantis
A professor of a private, Catholic university and outspoken critic of the environmentalist movement, Charles T. Rubin, likened Dennett in The New Atlantis to "a tone-deaf music scholar", criticized his "unwillingness to admit the limits of scientific rationality" and accused him of "deploying the same old Enlightenment tropes that didn't work all that well the first time around".

Philosophical reception 
Thomas Nagel said that Dennett's book was 'beneath him' and Edward Feser has extensively critiqued his book, criticising his interpretation of theistic arguments, whilst maintaining praise for his passages on cognitive neuroscience. Roger Scruton both praised and criticised Dennett's book in his book On Human Nature, endorsing his intellectual bravery and imaginative writing, yet criticising his reliance on the meme theory, and remaining sceptical of his view that all areas of human consciousness can be accessible through the neo-Darwinian human model alone.

Translations 

Breaking the Spell has been translated into several other languages, including:

See also 
 Religious studies
 Evolutionary psychology of religion

References

External links

Reviews
 David B. Hart, "Daniel Dennett Hunts the Snark" in First Things.
 George Johnson, "Getting a Rational Grip on Religion" in Scientific American.
 Leon Wieseltier, "The God Genome" in The New York Times.
 
 Adam Kirsch, "If Men Are From Mars, What's God" in The New York Sun.
 James Brookfield, "Dennett’s dangerous idea", World Socialist Website.
 Armin W. Geertz, "How Not to Do the Cognitive Science of Religion Today" (University of Aarhus seminar paper).
 Charles T. Rubin, "The God Meme" in The New Atlantis.

2006 non-fiction books
Analytic philosophy literature
Books by Daniel Dennett
Books critical of religion
Cognitive science literature
English-language books
New Atheism